Soiling may refer to:

Soiling (solar energy), the accumulation of material on light-collecting surfaces in solar energy systems
Fecal incontinence, a lack of control over defecation
Encopresis, involuntary fecal incontinence in children
Fecal leakage, a type of fecal incontinence in adults causing minor staining of undergarments

See also
Rectal discharge
Steatorrhea